KTUB (1600 AM) is a radio station which is currently silent, which previously broadcast a Regional Mexican/Spanish sports format. Licensed to Centerville, Utah, United States, it serves the Salt Lake City area. The station is owned by Alpha Media. KTUB provides Spanish language broadcasts for Real Salt Lake of Major League Soccer.

History
KBBC were the original call letters for this station. The station went on the air December 1, 1957. The original owner was Howard Pingree.  The station operated with 1,000 watts daytime only. In the early mid-1970s, the station's transmitter site was displaced by the construction of the I-15 freeway, and the transmitter and studios were relocated to the present location.  After the relocation, the station came back on the air with the call letters KLAT (talk spelled backwards) with an all talk format.  The all talk format featured several personalities who had been on KSXX, such as Joe Redburn, Tom Carlin, Jim Kirkwood, and others. After the financial failure of that operation, the station was brokered for a short time to Southern Nevada Communications Corporation, who are now known as Faith Communications Corporation, which organization afterward purchased KANN in Ogden, Utah, and still operate that station. As several of the owners of the station at that time were officers of a Savings and Loan, and had improperly made loans to the radio station, the Utah State Department of Financial Institutions seized the S&L and the station, shut it off, and in July 1977 auctioned the license and facilities to the highest bidder, which was Harold S. Schwartz and Associates. The Schwartz organization operated the station as a commercial Christian-religion format station, even though Mr. Schwartz and other principals in the organization were Jewish. The call letters were changed to KBBX as the original KBBC call was no longer available, and it was desired to get some name recognition from the original call. Schwartz increased the daytime power to 5,000 watts and built a sister FM station on 105.5 MHz which was later moved to 105.7 MHz. The FM station's original call letters were KSTU, but had been changed to KCGL by the time that the FM station went on the air December 24, 1979. (After the call letters KSTU were released, they were taken by a new TV station that is now the Fox affiliate in Salt Lake City.) Schwartz sold the station to Mid-America Gospel Network, the principals of which included several persons who had been key employees of Schwartz. Mid-America Gospel Network later sold the stations, and the AM and FM stations are no longer under common ownership.  The station changed call letters to KCPX on August 13, 1993 (the call KCPX had been released by the 1320 Salt Lake City station). On March 12, 1999, the station changed its call sign to KSGO, on September 20, 2004 to KRRD, and on September 13, 2005 to KXTA. On November 2, 2007, the station became the current KTUB.

Bustos Media used to own the station. In September 2010, Bustos transferred most of its licenses to Adelante Media Group as part of a settlement with its lenders. Alpha Media bought Adelante's Salt Lake City stations for $3.15 million on July 16, 2015.On October 17, 2022, KTUB went dark (broadcasting). A request for special temporary authority to remain silent was filed with the FCC on October 28, 2022 due to loss of KTUB's tower site lease and dismantlement of the station's radio towers.

References

External links
FCC History Cards for KTUB

Regional Mexican radio stations in the United States
Mass media in Salt Lake City
TUB
Radio stations established in 1957
1957 establishments in Utah
Alpha Media radio stations